Phosphatidylcholine:ceramide cholinephosphotransferase 1 is an enzyme that in humans is encoded by the SGMS1 gene.

Function 

The protein encoded by this gene is predicted to be a five-pass transmembrane protein. This gene may be predominately expressed in brain.

Model organisms 

Model organisms have been used in the study of SGMS1 function. A conditional knockout mouse line called Sgms1tm1a(EUCOMM)Wtsi was generated at the Wellcome Trust Sanger Institute. Male and female animals underwent a standardized phenotypic screen to determine the effects of deletion. Additional screens performed:  - In-depth immunological phenotyping

References

Further reading